John Edward Bernard Hill (13 November 1912 – 6 December 2007) was a British barrister, farmer and Conservative politician who served as Member of Parliament (MP) for South Norfolk for 19 years, from 1955 to 1974. He was also one of the UK's first MEPs, serving from 1973 to 1974.

Biography
Hill was the only son of Captain Robert Hill, an officer in the Cambridgeshire Regiment.  He was educated at Charterhouse School and Merton College, Oxford, where he gained a football Blue in 1934. After two years travelling in Asia and the Middle East, he became a barrister, called to the Bar at Inner Temple in 1938. He was commissioned into 64th Field Regiment, Royal Artillery in 1939, shortly before the outbreak of the Second World War, and was attached for some time to the skiing unit of the 5th Battalion Scots Guards.  From 1942 he served as an air observation pilot, flying spotter planes in Tunisia with No. 651 Squadron RAF.  He was severely wounded, and invalided out of the Army in 1945 with the rank of Captain.

After the war, he took up farming, buying a  farm near Halesworth in Suffolk.  He was a councillor on Wainford Rural District Council, Suffolk from 1946 to 1953, and a senior member of various East Anglian river and flood defence boards.  He served as a governor of Charterhouse School from 1958 to 1990, and on the council of the University of East Anglia from 1975 to 1982.

Hill was elected to the House of Commons on 13 January 1955, in a by-election caused by the expulsion of the sitting Conservative MP, Captain Peter Baker, after Baker's conviction for uttering, forgery and fraud and subsequent imprisonment for seven years.  Hill scraped home with a majority reduced to only 865. He held then seat later that year at the 1955 general election, and was re-elected in four subsequent general elections (in 1959, 1964, 1966 and 1970). His majority fell to only 119 in 1966.  He did not stand in the February 1974 general election and was succeeded as MP by John MacGregor.

In Parliament, Hill concentrated mainly on the agricultural interests of his largely rural constituency.  Elected to the executive of the 1922 Committee in November 1956, in the aftermath of the Suez Crisis, he became an assistant government whip in January 1959 alongside Willie Whitelaw. While an MP, he pressed for the introduction of a small clock in the corner of the internal monitors, which would tell everyone within the Palace of Westminster how long a member has been speaking for.

Hill served as a Lord Commissioner of the Treasury from 1960 to 1964 and as Opposition spokesman on education and science briefly in 1965–66.  He was later active on the education and agriculture select committees.  He supported Edward Heath's policy of joining the European Economic Community, and was a delegate to the Council of Europe and the Western European Union.  When the UK joined the EEC in 1973, Hill was appointed as a Member of the European Parliament (MEP), and served from January 1973 until July 1974. At that time, MEPs were appointed by national parliaments, rather than being directly elected.

In later life Hill concentrated on farming.  He collected British art, particularly paintings by Samuel Palmer.  He married Edith Luard (née Maxwell) in 1944; she died in 1995.  Hill was survived by their adopted daughter.

References

External links 
 
 John Hill Archive, University of East Anglia

1912 births
2007 deaths
Royal Artillery officers
Conservative Party (UK) MPs for English constituencies
UK MPs 1951–1955
UK MPs 1955–1959
UK MPs 1959–1964
UK MPs 1964–1966
UK MPs 1966–1970
UK MPs 1970–1974
People educated at Charterhouse School
Alumni of Merton College, Oxford
People associated with the University of East Anglia
Councillors in Suffolk
Conservative Party (UK) MEPs
MEPs for the United Kingdom 1973–1979
Ministers in the Macmillan and Douglas-Home governments, 1957–1964
British Army personnel of World War II
British World War II pilots